This is a list of Members of Parliament elected at the 1966 general election, held on 31 March.

By nation 

 List of MPs for constituencies in Scotland (1966–1970

Composition
These representative diagrams show the composition of the parties in the 1966 general election.

Note: This is not the official seating plan of the House of Commons, which has five rows of benches on each side, with the government party to the right of the Speaker and opposition parties to the left, but with room for only around two-thirds of MPs to sit at any one time.

This is a list of members of Parliament elected to the Parliament of the United Kingdom at the 1966 general election, held on 31 March.

Notable newcomers to the House of Commons included David Owen, John Nott, Michael Heseltine, Jack Ashley, Donald Dewar, Gwyneth Dunwoody, John Pardoe, David Winnick, Gerry Fitt and Andrew Faulds.



By-elections
See the list of United Kingdom by-elections.

See also
 List of parliaments of the United Kingdom
 UK general election, 1966
 List of United Kingdom by-elections

1966
1966 United Kingdom general election
 List
UK MPs